Curculionichthys piracanjuba is a species of catfish in the family Loricariidae. It is native to South America, where it is known only from Brazil. It reaches 2.7 cm (1.1 inches) SL.

References 

Loricariidae
Fish described in 2012